Rasmus Törnblom (born January 22, 1990) is a Swedish Moderate Party politician who was chairman of the Moderate Youth League from 2014 to 2016.

He previously served as chairman of the Moderate School Youth and association board member of the Moderate Youth League.

References 

1990 births
Living people
Moderate Party politicians